The Espelette pepper (French: Piment d'Espelette  ; Basque: Ezpeletako biperra) is a variety of Capsicum annuum that is cultivated in the French commune of Espelette, Pyrénées-Atlantiques, traditionally the northern territory of the Basque people. On 1 June 2000, it was classified as an AOC product and was confirmed as an APO product on 22 August 2002.

Chili pepper, originating in Central and South America, was introduced into France during the 16th century. After first being used medicinally, it became popular as a condiment and for the conservation of meats. It is now a cornerstone of Basque cuisine, where it has gradually replaced black pepper and it is a key ingredient in piperade.

AOC espelette peppers are cultivated in the following communes: Ainhoa, Cambo-les-Bains, Espelette, Halsou, Itxassou, Jatxou, Larressore, Saint-Pée-sur-Nivelle, Souraïde, and Ustaritz. They are harvested in late summer and, in September, characteristic festoons of pepper are hung on balconies and house walls throughout the communes to dry out. An annual pepper festival organized by Confrérie du Piment d'Espelette, held since 1968 on the last weekend in October, attracts some 20,000 tourists.

This pepper attains a maximum grade of only 4,000 on the Scoville scale and is therefore considered only mildly hot. It can be purchased as festoons of fresh or dried peppers, as ground pepper, or puréed or pickled in jars.

In the United States, non-AOC espelette peppers grown and marketed in California may be fresher than imported AOC espelette peppers.

According to the Syndicat du Piment d’Espelette, the cooperative formed to get the AOC designation, there are 160 producers of AOC Piment d'Espelette that plant  and in 2014, they produced 203 tons of powdered Piment d'Espelette and 1,300 tons of raw pepper.

Notes

References
  Larousse Gastronomique (1998). Paris: Larousse-Bordas. 
 Paprika Tap de Cortí

External links
  Piment d'Espelette, site dedicated to the pepper

Basque cuisine
Chili peppers
French products with protected designation of origin
Capsicum cultivars